The Armstrong Siddeley Tiger was a British 14-cylinder air-cooled aircraft radial engine developed by Armstrong Siddeley in the 1930s from their Jaguar engine. The engine was built in a number of different versions but performance and dimensions stayed relatively unchanged. The Tiger VIII was the first British aircraft engine to use a two-speed supercharger.

Applications
Armstrong Whitworth A.W.19
Armstrong Whitworth AW.23
Armstrong Whitworth A.W.29
Armstrong Whitworth Ensign 
Armstrong Whitworth Whitley
Blackburn B-6
Blackburn B-7
Blackburn Shark
Blackburn Ripon
Fairey G4/31
Handley Page H.P.51 
Short Calcutta

Engines on display
A preserved Armstrong Siddeley Tiger is on display at the Science Museum (London).

Specifications (Tiger VIII)

See also

References

Notes

Bibliography

 Gunston, Bill. World Encyclopedia of Aero Engines. Cambridge, England. Patrick Stephens Limited, 1989. 
 Lumsden, Alec. British Piston Engines and their Aircraft. Marlborough, Wiltshire: Airlife Publishing, 2003. .

External links
 Oldengine.org

1930s aircraft piston engines
Aircraft air-cooled radial piston engines
Tiger